Bou Saada (bu s‘adah, meaning "place of happiness") is a town and municipality in M'Sila Province, Algeria, situated 245 km south of Algiers. As Arena it was the site of a city and bishopric in Roman Africa, now a Catholic titular see. The municipal population was estimated at 134,000 in 2008.

Geography 
Bou-Saada is located in the southwest of the Hodna region in the Hauts Plateaux, at the feet of the Ouled Naïl Range of the Saharan Atlas.

Bou-Saada has traditionally been an important market place producing and selling jewelry, metalwork, carpets and bousaadi knives. There is also a textile mill in town. Even in modern times, Bou-Saada is an important trading post for nomads. There is also some national tourism during winter.
Bou-Saada is well-connected with other urban centres by road. M'Sila is 70 km northeast, Biskra is 175 km east, Bordj Bou Arreridj 130 km northeast and Djelfa 120 km southwest.
Bou-Saada has two quarters, the old medina (ksar) within the city walls with arched alleyways, and the French town to the south. Surrounding the town are extensive date groves.

Climate
Bou Saada has a cold desert climate (Köppen climate classification BWk). Rainfall is higher in winter than in summer. About  of precipitation falls annually.

Ecclesiastical history 
Arena was important enough in the Late Roman province of Mauretania Caesariensis to be one of the many suffragans of its capital Caesarea Mauretaniae's Metropolitan Archbishopric; discontinued as a consequence of the Arab conquest of North Africa.

Titular see 
The diocese was nominally restored in 1933 as Latin Catholic titular bishopric.

It has had the following incumbents, of the fitting episcopal (lowest) rank :
 Luís António de Almeida (1935.10.04 – 1941.04.19)
 Joseph-Conrad Chaumont (1941.06.28 – 1966.10.08)
 György Zemplén (1969.01.10 – 1973.03.29)
 Roger-Émile Aubry, Redemptorists (C.SS.R.) (1973.06.14 – 2010.02.17)
 Mário Antônio da Silva (2010.06.09 – ...), Auxiliary Bishop of Manaus (Brazil)

Rock art 
In the municipality, located not far from the village of Ben Srour, are several petroglyph sites of archaeological interest.

See also 

 A Bou Saâda local football (soccer) club Amel

References

Sources and external links
 GCatholic with titular incumbent links

Communes of M'Sila Province
Cities in Algeria